Malti Chahar (born 14th November ) is an Indian actress/model, director and producer who works predominantly in Hindi films.

She is known for her role in Genius and for her debut as lead in Ishk Pashmina.

Early life and career 
Malti  was born on 14th November in Agra, India.

Her father, Lokendra Singh Chahar is retired from the Indian Air Force and her mother, Pushpa Chahar, is a housewife.

She did her schooling from K.V. and completed her B.tech in CSE from IET Lucknow. Indian cricketer Deepak Chahar is her sibling and  Indian crickter Rahul Chahar is her cousin.

She started her modelling career in 2014 from Miss India. She  won Miss India Delhi 2014, 2nd Runner Up and she was finalist in Miss India 2014. She won Miss Photogenic in Miss India Delhi 2014 and Miss Sudoku in Miss India 2014. 

She started her acting career in 2018 with her Hindi debut film Genius as second lead. And then her Hindi film Ishq Pashmina as lead was released on 22 sept 2022.

In 2018 she went viral when a cameraman captured her during an IPL match  CSK Vs KKR and she got fame as Mystery girl and Parley G girl.

Filmography

Films

Short films

Music videos

References

External links 

Malti Chahar on Facebook